The Department of the West, later known as the Western Department, was a major command (Department) of the United States Army during the 19th century. It oversaw the military affairs in the country west of the Mississippi River to the borders of California and Oregon.

Organization
The Department of the West was created in a reform of army organization nationwide on October 31, 1853, from a consolidation of the existing 6th Military District (headquartered at Jefferson Barracks, Missouri) and 7th Military District (Fort Smith, Arkansas) Departments. It reported directly to the headquarters of the Army in Washington, D.C.  In the 1853 reorganization the Department of the Pacific was also created, from consolidation of the 10th (California) and 11th (Oregon) Departments.  The Department of the West's headquarters continued at Jefferson Barracks in St. Louis, although it moved briefly to Fort Leavenworth, Kansas, during the Bleeding Kansas skirmishes.

Civil War
As the Southern states were seceding, just before the American Civil War began, the department was organized to include the country west of the Mississippi River and east of the Rocky Mountains, except for Texas, Utah Territory, and New Mexico Territory, including Missouri, Arkansas, Iowa, Minnesota, Kansas Territory (the state of Kansas after January 29, 1861), Nebraska Territory, Colorado Territory (after February 28, 1861), Dakota Territory (after March 2, 1861), Indian Territory (later the state of Oklahoma), and Louisiana west of the Mississippi River. On June 6, 1861, Missouri was transferred to the Department of the Ohio.

Western Department
On July 31, 1861, the Department of the West was merged into the Western Department of Maj. Gen. John C. Frémont. The Western Department, which had been organized on July 3, 1861, also included Missouri and Illinois from the Department of the Ohio and New Mexico Territory from the Department of New Mexico. Western Kentucky was added from the Department of Kentucky on August 15, 1861. Frémont was relieved by Maj. Gen. David Hunter under the orders of President Abraham Lincoln, contingent upon the circumstance that Frémont did not lead an army into battle by October 24, 1861. The Western Department was discontinued on November 9, 1861, with New Mexico Territory being transferred back to the Department of New Mexico, and the rest being divided between the Departments of Missouri and Kansas.

Command history
Department commanders were:

Department of the West

Western Department

See also
Army of the West (1846)
Department of the Pacific
Department of the Missouri

References
 Eicher, John H., & Eicher, David J., Civil War High Commands, Stanford University Press, 2001, .
 Military History at rootsweb.com

Notes

West
West, Department of the
1853 establishments in the United States